John Mantle may refer to:

 John Mantle (bishop) (1946–2010), Bishop of Brechin
 John Mantle (rugby) (1942–2018), British rugby footballer
Jack Foreman Mantle (1917–1940), VC recipient

See also
John Mantley (1920–2003), actor, writer, director, screenwriter and producer